Taylorville Township is one of seventeen townships in Christian County, Illinois, USA.  As of the 2020 census, its population was 11,539 and it contained 5,801 housing units.

Geography

Cities, towns, villages
 Taylorville (northern portion)

Unincorporated towns
 Langleyville at

Cemeteries
The township contains these four cemeteries: Glen Haven Memorial Gardens, Langley, Oak Hill and Young.

Major highways
  Illinois Route 29
  Illinois Route 48
  Illinois Route 104

Airports and landing strips
 Taylorville Municipal Airport

Demographics
As of the 2020 census there were 11,539 people, 5,398 households, and 2,765 families residing in the township. The racial makeup of the township was 93.91% White, 0.83% African American, 0.23% Native American, 0.79% Asian, 0.02% Pacific Islander, 0.53% from other races, and 3.69% from two or more races. Hispanic or Latino of any race were 1.56% of the population.

There were 5,398 households, out of which 26.20% had children under the age of 18 living with them, 38.37% were married couples living together, 9.73% had a female householder with no spouse present, and 48.78% were non-families. 42.10% of all households were made up of individuals, and 20.10% had someone living alone who was 65 years of age or older. The average household size was 2.11 and the average family size was 2.95.

The township's age distribution consisted of 21.0% under the age of 18, 6.1% from 18 to 24, 26.2% from 25 to 44, 26.1% from 45 to 64, and 20.5% who were 65 years of age or older. The median age was 42.5 years. For every 100 females, there were 84.1 males. For every 100 females age 18 and over, there were 79.4 males.

The median income for a household in the township was $42,471, and the median income for a family was $64,561. Males had a median income of $43,765 versus $26,250 for females. The per capita income for the township was $26,723. About 8.8% of families and 12.1% of the population were below the poverty line, including 12.3% of those under age 18 and 11.2% of those age 65 or over.

School districts
 Edinburg Community Unit School District 4
 Taylorville Community Unit School District 3

Political districts
 State House District 87
 State House District 98
 State Senate District 44
 State Senate District 49

References
 
 United States Census Bureau 2009 TIGER/Line Shapefiles
 United States National Atlas

External links
 City-Data.com
 Illinois State Archives
 Township Officials of Illinois

Townships in Christian County, Illinois
Townships in Illinois